Guite is the progenitor clan of Mizo people He is also said to be the Older Brother of Thadou progenitor of the Thadou people. Mostly the Guite clan speak mizo language . Some known as Zomi and few also as kuki in India and as Zogam in Myanmar (Burma). Depending on local pronunciation, the clan was also called differently such as Nguite, Vuite, and was also recorded even as Gwete, Gwite, Nwite. In accord with the claim of their solar origin, the Guite clan has been called nampi, meaning noble or major or even dominant people, of the region in local dialect in the past.

Adoption of the name

The name Guite is a direct derivation of the name of the progenitor of the family, known as Guite the Great (see, following genealogical charts), whose mysterious birth was, according to oral tradition, related to the Sun. Therefore, in order to reflect this solar relationship (i.e., "ni gui" meaning the ray of the Sun), the name "Guite" is said given at his birth by his father, Songthu(also Chawngthu,Thawngthu), also known as Prince of Aisan. Further, in reference to this noble birth, a local proverb was circulated that is still known in the region. The proverb says:
Nampi' ta ni in zong siam [Local Proverb, c. 12th century]
(Meaning)
Even the Sun bless the noble birth.

Some notable Guite princes

Ciimnuai generation

Ton Lun. Being known as the first to celebrate the festival of Ton, therefore, was traditionally known as Ton Mang, meaning the Master/Lord of Ton (cf., name of his grandson in genealogical chart).

Ni Gui. A renowned Guite prince, who, according to oral tradition, was said to formulate most of traditional rites and cultural practices (i.e., tributary system, festive songs and lyrics, religio-social festivals, social family system, etc.) that some of them are still in practice in present northern Chin State of Myanmar and present Lamka (Churachandpur or even New Lamka) area of Manipur India.

Gui Mang I. The prince who organized the Ciimnuai (Chiimnuai, Chinwe) city-state that its remainings can still be collected at nearby present village of Saizang, Tedim township. Further, the following folksong was ascribed to be a composed of Prince Gui Mang:
Mang ii tusuan kil bang hong khang ing, Zaang aa pehsik gawm ing;
Khuakiim aa mi siahseu in kai ing, ka khua Ciimtui tungah ka vang kaammei awi sang sa zaw ee [G. Mang, c. AD. 1300]
(Translation)
I, the royal descendant, has grown up like a three, bringing irons and coppers from the plain;
Collecting taxes and tributes from around, my fame and reputation been even more than wild fire.
Mang Suum I. The eldest son of Gui Mang I, who divided the land into three major regions—the upper region tuilu (Guava) under his youngest brother Nak Sau (or Kul Lai), the lower region tuitaw (Vangteh via Tawizawi) under his younger brother Kul Gen and the central region (Ciimnuai) under his suzerainty. This is the beginning of the attribution of Mual thum kampau Guite Mang to the Guite family, meaning the supreme ruling clan of the three-mountains-region, which are the Ciim Taang (central Ciim mountain region), the Khum Taang (south-eastern Khum mountain region), and the Len Taang (north-western Len mountain region). The legend of this division is still remembered with a folktale related to following folksong:
Tuilu aa pai ni leh kha siam, tuitaw aa pai simzawng vontawi dawnto peeng mawh [Interpretation of Prince Nak Sau of a mythical bird that was said singing this song while three princes were making discussion and divination at the place called Nakhuzaang, c. 14th century]
(Translation)
To go up to the upper river is to be blessed by the sun and the moon; to go down to the lower river is to be poor but would have wine.
Further, there are also another existing poetic song retained in Vangteh chronicle that marked this land division:
Ciim leh Tawi tui a ih maankhawm in, ning leh ai-sa in kizawituah ang;
Tuu bang suanh dang in ki-el lo-in, phung Gui ni nuai-ah kibawmtuah ang [M. Suum I & K. Gen, c. 1400].
(Translation):
As long as the people of Ciim (short form for Ciimnuai) and people of Tawi (short form for Tawizawi) reign or prosper, let us maintain our fellowship banquet, a banquet of wine and meat;
Let our offspring not go against each other but let us join together under the name of solar Gui family.

Vangteh generation

Gen Dong. Making Vangteh as his political center, began extending Guite's dynastic rule to the south (tuitaw) and westward crossing the Manipur river, and also was well documented in the oral traditions of other tribes also. The birth-story of Prince Gen Dong was behind a popular nursery rhyme that is still in use in several local places, such as Vangteh, Saizang, Kaptel, etc. The rhyme, as originally composed by Prince Mang Suum, is as following:
Ka nau aw ee, Gen Dong aw, Ciimnuai dongah Gen dong aw [M. Suum I, c. 1400].
(Translation):
My little baby, named Gen Dong (meaning Gen is asking or taking counsel), that Gen (reference to Kul Gen) has asked of me to far Ciimnuai in showing of his respect.
Mang Kiim. A capable prince from Vangteh, who travelled more than fifty three towns and villages, making sacred rites, called Uisiang-at in native language, in claiming of Guite's dynastic rule and guardianship of the land as Priestly King.

Pau Hau. A powerful Guite prince from Vangteh, who was known as the one who went down to Chittagong (present Bangladesh) to learn gunpowder and as the first person to use it in the region. Under his leadership, Vangteh became the capital of seven princes, therefore known as the center of "Hausa sagih leh tuangdung dawh sagih," meaning seven princes and seven courts.

Tun Kam. A contemporary of Pau Hau and a Guite prince from Vangteh but more known as Prince of Tualphai, who is a member of seven princes of Vangteh and also a member of the Association of Nine Lords in the then Tedim region.

Tedim-Lamzang generation

Gui Mang II. The prince who was said to be the first to found present Tedim with the accompaniment of other tribes such as Gangte, Vaiphei, and probably others collectively identified as Simte (people from lower region). The name was said derived from a sprinkling light of the pool called Vansaangdim under bright sunlight. Therefore, is called TE, meaning "bright shining," and DIM, meaning "sprinkling, twinkling, and so even likely celebrating." This is a commemorative song for the founding.
 Dimtui vangkhua sai bang ka sat, nunnop tonzawi ka kaihna;
 Sangmang lapna ka khawlmual aw, siah leh litui cingkhawm ee [Guimang II, c. AD 1550].
 (Translation):
 Native Dimtui which I founded, full of good life and festivals;
 My resting place where I hanged my banners, and where taxes and tributes are flooded like waters filled the pool [Guimang II, c. AD 1550].

Pum Go. The prince who restated his capital from Lamzang to Tedim. A folksong, said to be composed by him in commemoration of the festival of Ton, is still sung in the region as following:
Dimtui vangkhua khuamun nuam aw, sial leh sawm taang a tunna; Sial leh sawm taang a tunna, siingta'n lamh bang eng na ee;
Taang silsial ee, taang silsial ee, Dimtui vangkhua taang silsial ee; Dimtui vangkhua taang silsial ee, kawi tawh laukha ka hualna hi ee [P. Go, c. AD. 1740]
(Translation):
Very comfortable place is my native Dimtui (a poetic attribution to TE DIM), where all my dreams fulfilled; Where all my dreams fulfilled, that everyone envies of my native;
It's shining, yes, shining, my native Dimtui is shining modestly; My native Dimtui is shining modestly, where I made lasting vow to my beloved (dear wife).

Mualpi generation
Go Khaw Thang. A powerful prince from Mualpi, also known as Goukhothang or Go Khua Thang, or even as Kokutung by Carey and Tuck. He is the only Zomi prince whom the neighbouring Meitei (Manipur) Kingdom ever acknowledged as Raja (or Ningthou in Metei language). His powerful dominion spread over more than 70 cities, towns, and villages. He was known as the then leader of all Zo people as Carey and Tuck also noted him as the Yo (correct Zo people) Chief of Mwelpi (correct Mualpi).

He, along with his contemporary, Kamhau, defeated the Meitei Raja on several occasions. Kamhau is another popular name in ZO history. Kamhau respected and held the Guites in high regard. Although a powerful ruler himself, he is said to be many paces behind Goukhothang in bravery, skill, tact and diplomacy. In fact, the Zomis of that time were all under the Guite banner, one way or the other.

Suum Kam. Son of Raja Goukhothang is another powerful Guite prince. He made a peace-treaty called Treaty of Sanjentong with Maharaja Chandrakirti on 11 March 1875, marking the boundary of the Guites and the Meiteis at the present Moirang of Manipur, covenanted the non-interference between the Guites and the Meiteis but friendship, and promised to betroth a Meitei princess to the house of Prince Suum Kam in securing peace (see, the ending part of Raja Goukhothang Documentary video). In commemoration of this treaty, Suum Kam composed a poetic song as following:
Tuan a pupa leh Khang vaimangte' tongchiamna Kaangtui minthang aw,
Penlehpi leh Kaangtui minthang, A tua Zota kual hi ee [S. Kam, 1875]
(Translation):
The famous crystal water, where forefathers and Indian kings (a reference to Maharaja of Manipur) of lower region made a covenant,
The great sea and crystal water (a reference to Loktak Lake), whereby is called to be the home of Zo descendants.

Genealogical charts
Out of many political centers of the once Guite dynastic rule, Lamzang-Tedim (later shifted to Mualpi or Molpi until last camp at Hanship in present Churachandpur (Lamka) District of Manipur), Tuimui, Selbung, Haiciin, and Vangteh were the most prominent places. Due to geographical distance, and as times passed by, of course, there are several minor differences of the chronicles retained in each places as provided below for comparison.

Comparative chronicles: early period

Comparative rearrangements

Clarification of abbreviations
(Alphabetical order)
BE: British era in the land (from early 20th century)
Chro: Short form from "chronicle"
F: Female descendant
GMT: Raja Gokhothang Memorial Trust, Lamka, Manipur
KN: Mr. Khai Nang (Mr. Nang might probably be the first in the region to put such chronicle in formal writing, though handwriting. He put this chronicle into his handwriting in 1925, when his younger brother, Kaang Za Cin needs proof of his ancestral line for a promotion to the post of Viceroy's Commissioned Officer, also known as Subedar, in the British Army [Indo-Burma frontier])
KZT: Capt. K. A. Khup Za Thang (the late), a contemporary historian on the history of Zo
LC: Legendary Ciimnuai, legendary ancestral home known as Ciimnuai
LK: Lamka of Churachandpur District, Manipur, India
MS, KG, NS: legendary three Guite princes—Mang Sum (the first), Kul Gen (Kul Ngen), and Nak Sau (prob. Kul Lai)
NZL: Mr. Ngul Lian Zam, a contemporary local historian and a villager of Vangteh, presently settling in Kawlpi-Kalay Myo (He is the publisher of the said handbook entitled Tedim Myone Vangteh Kyeyua Yoya Nat Sayamya Ih Puzaw Patah Chin Saingya Gahtamya: Sacred Incantations for Religious Rites Performed by Priests of Traditional Religion of Vangteh, Tedim Township [Pinlone, Kalay Myo, Myanmar: U N. L. Zam, Guite Myonwe Su-win, 2005], i+8+1. This handbook was published under the permission letter no. 012/thathana(tata)/2004 of the Myanmar Government [Ministry of Religious Affairs] in keeping of the existing culture of Vangteh in 2004. This small handbook, though very limited in content, can still give some basic necessary information about the past story of the Vangteh in particular and also of the present northern Chin state at a glance in general)
OT: Old Taaksat, an ancestral home, somewhere in present Kalay Valley, might be very close to Nwa-la-bo Taung, southwest to present Kalay Myo (Kawlpi)
PE: Present era
PG: Present generation
PT-C: Tedim region of present Chin State, Myanmar (Burma)
SB: Selbung, a political center of the once Guite dynasty, still existing as a middle size village at the very northern Indian border of present Tonzang township, Chin State, Myanmar
TM: Tuimui, a political center of the once Guite dynasty, still existing as a middle size village in present Tonzang township
TH: Thuam Hang, the last hereditary prince of Tuimui
TZC: Mr. Tual Za Cin, a villager of Tuimui and contemporary local historian
TZS: Tun Za Sing, also known as Prince of Mualai, the last hereditary Guite prince of Vangteh
VT: Vangteh, a political center of the once Guite dynasty, still existing as a large size village in present Tedim township

Tradition of Guite dynastic rule
By dating the establishment of the Ciimnuai city-state of present Tedim township to be the early 14th century, Guite dynastic rule can rightly be said to be more than half a century long (until British annexation in the early 20th century, c. 1300–1900), though most southern part of its tributary land was gradually turned to the allied force of southern Pawihang (Poi or Pawite) beginning from the mid-18th century. As cited above, following the legend of land division between the three legendary Guite princes (M. Suum, K. Gen, and N. Sau), the geopolitics of the Guite dynasty can accordingly be divided into three major regions---the central Ciimnuai region under Mang Suum I, the lower Tuitaw region under Kul Gen, and the upper Tuilu region under Nak Sau (Kul Lai). Though the Guite dynastic traditions of the two elder princes were respectively kept alive until the advancement of the British army, the story of the youngest prince Nak Sau was unfortunately lost from sight except a very brief oral account retained in Vangteh chronicle (that traces Kom Kiim as the daughter of Tom Cil, the last known prince from the line of Nak Sau, and the rest was said as if became the Gorkhas or at least banded together with). While reserving for the lost tradition of Prince Nak Sau, reflecting from the available traditions of Mang Suum and Kul Gen, the two most distinctive features of the Guite dynastic tradition would be its religious orientedness and its confederated administrative system.

Endnotes

See also
Chin
Tedim
Paite
Vangteh
Zomi
Zomia

References
Carey, Bertram S. and Henry N. Tuck. The Chin Hills: A History of the People, Our Dealings with Them, Their Customs and Manners, and a Gazetteer of Their Country. Rangoon, Burma: Government Printing, 1896.
Gougin, T. History of Zomi. Lamka, India: T. Gougin, 1984 [this book is available for view in digitized format at the library of the University of Michigan since 8 November 2006].
Guite, Dr. Chinkholian Guite, Reader, Lamka College, Politico-Economic Development of the Tribals of Manipur: A Study of the Zomis. New Delhi, India: Anmol Publications Pvt. Ltd., 1999.
Khai, Sing K. Zo People and Their Culture. Lamka, Churachandpur, India: Khampu Hatzaw, 1995.
Kham, Pum Za. Manuscripts. Tonzang, Chin State, Myanmar.
Lalthangliana, B. History of Mizo in Burma. A master's thesis submitted to Arts & Science University, Mandalay, Burma, 1975, unpublished [available for view at the university library of the Arts & Science University of Mandalay].
Shaw, William. The Thadou Kukis. Culcutta, India: Cultural Publication of Asiatic Society of Bengal, 1929.
Sinha, Surajit. Tribal Polities and State Systems in Pre-Colonial Eastern and North Eastern India. Culcutta, India: Centre for Studies in Social Sciences, K. P. Bagchi & Co., 1987.
Thang, Khup Za, capt., K. A. Zo Suan Khang Simna Laibu: the Genealogy of the Zo (Chin) Race of Burma. Parague, 1972.
Tuan, C. Thang Za, Prof. "Zomi Tanchin Tomkim," in Zolus Journal 4 (1999): 3-6 [Dr. Tuan is a retired Deputy Director General of Basic Education Dept., the Ministry of Education, Myanmar].
Zam, Ngul Lian (Guite). Mualthum Kampau Guite Hausate Tangthu. Kawlpi, Kale Myo, Myanmar: Khumhnuai Laibusaal, 2018. .

External links
Ethnologue: Languages of the World

Ethnic groups in Bangladesh
Ethnic groups in Manipur
Ethnic groups in Tripura
Ethnic groups in Myanmar
Tribes of Assam
Kuki tribes
Headhunting
Scheduled Tribes of Assam
Scheduled Tribes of Meghalaya